The Case for Democracy is a foreign policy manifesto written by one-time Soviet political prisoner and former Israeli Member of the Knesset, Natan Sharansky. Sharansky's friend Ron Dermer is the book's co-author. The book achieved the bestsellers lists of the New York Times, Washington Post and Foreign Affairs.

In the book, Sharansky and Dermer argue that the primary goal of American foreign policy, as well as that of the free world, should be the expansion of democracy. The book advocates a moral foreign policy based on belief in the universality of freedom and human rights. Sharansky and Dermer argue that nations that respect their citizens will also respect their neighbors. The book is sub-titled, The Power of Freedom to Overcome Tyranny and Terror. The authors express passionate and controversial arguments against any compromise on the road to freedom.

It has been read and famously endorsed  by former United States president George W. Bush. Other members of his administration, including former Secretary of State Condoleezza Rice, have also read the book.

See also
Defending Identity
Town square test

Sources
Natan Sharansky, Ron Dermer, The Case for Democracy. The Power of Freedom to Overcome Tyranny and Terror, (2004, hardcover) (2006,  paperback).

References

External links
Washington Times interview with George Bush where he comments on the book.
After Words interview with Sharansky on The Case for Democracy, February 13, 2005

2004 non-fiction books
Political books
Books by Natan Sharansky
English-language books
Collaborative non-fiction books